Vladyslav Olehovych Naumets (born 7 March 1999) is a Ukrainian professional footballer who plays as a winger for Chornomorets Odesa.

Youth career

Naumets started his career from the academies of FC Zorya Luhansk and FC Dynamo Kyiv, winning the 2017–18 Ukrainian Premier League Under-21 and Under-19 with the latter.

Club career

PAS Giannina 
Naumets signed for PAS Giannina a club in the city of Ioannina in 2018. In the season 2019–20 with the club won the Football League and got promoted to the Super League Greece. On 3 February 2021 he scored his first goal in the Greek Cup opening the score for the 2–3 victory against Atromitos. He played also against Panathinaikos where he got into the semi-final of 2020–21 Greek Cup, where he played at home and away rounds.

Mynai
In February 2022, after three years in Greece, he returned to Ukraine and he signed for Mynai a team in Ukrainian Premier League.

Chornomorets Odesa
In July 2022 he moved to Chornomorets Odesa.In February 2023 he left the club with mutual agreement.

Metalist Kharkiv
In March 2023 he signed for Metalist Kharkiv.

International career
In 2014 he was called up by the Ukraine under-16 and made eight appearances. In 2015 he played 14 matches for Ukraine's under-17s, scoring two goals. The following year, he was called up to the Ukraine under-18 side and made two appearances.

Career statistics

Club

International

Honours
PAS Giannina
 Super League Greece 2: 2019–20

Dynamo Kyiv U21
 Ukrainian youth championship: 2017–18

Individual
 Top Scorer Ukrainian Premier League Reserves and Under 21: Runner up 2017–18 (11 goals).

References

External links
 
 Vladyslav Naumets at UAF
 Instagram

1999 births
Living people
Footballers from Zhytomyr
Ukrainian footballers
Association football wingers
Ukraine youth international footballers
PAS Giannina F.C. players
FC Mynai players
FC Chornomorets Odesa players
Super League Greece players
Super League Greece 2 players
Ukrainian Premier League players
Ukrainian expatriate footballers
Ukrainian expatriate sportspeople in Greece
Expatriate footballers in Greece